Hörselberg-Hainich is a municipality in the Wartburgkreis district of Thuringia, Germany. It was formed on 1 December 2007 combining the former municipalities of Behringen and Hörselberg.

References 

Wartburgkreis